Yakov Lobanov-Rostovsky may refer to:
Yakov Lobanov-Rostovsky (1660–1732), Russian statesman and civil servant
Yakov Lobanov-Rostovsky (1760–1831), Russian statesman